The Chapel of All Saints is located in Tarnobrzeg, Poland in Sobów Borough, on a municipal cemetery, on Litewska Street. The building was initiated by the provost of Serbinów parish of Our Lady of Perpetual Help Michał Józefczyk. Work started at the beginning of 2009, and ended at the end of October.

Buildings and structures in Tarnobrzeg
Roman Catholic chapels in Poland
Roman Catholic churches completed in 2009
Roman Catholic churches in Tarnobrzeg
21st-century Roman Catholic church buildings
21st-century churches in Poland